The Marvel Cinematic Universe (MCU) is a media franchise and shared fictional universe that is the setting of superhero television series based on characters that appear in Marvel Comics publications. The MCU first expanded to television with series from Marvel Television that released from 2013 until 2020 on ABC, Netflix, Hulu, and Freeform. Marvel Studios—the production studio behind the films—began releasing series on Disney+ as part of Phase Four. WandaVision began streaming in 2021, and was followed by The Falcon and the Winter Soldier, the first season of Loki, the first season of the animated What If...?, and Hawkeye, while Moon Knight, Ms. Marvel, and She-Hulk: Attorney at Law were released in 2022; the phase also includes two Marvel Studios Special Presentations. Phase Five series set to be released in 2023 include Secret Invasion and the second season of Loki, with the second season of What If...?, Ironheart, Echo, and Agatha: Coven of Chaos with a year of release not yet set, and Daredevil: Born Again being planned for 2024. The animated series Spider-Man: Freshman Year and Marvel Zombies are also planned for 2024, while an untitled drama series set in Wakanda, Wonder Man, and Vision Quest are also in development. These series feature greater interconnectivity with the feature films than those from Marvel Television, with many actors reprising their roles from the MCU films and the Marvel Television series.

For Phase Four, reprising their roles are Elizabeth Olsen as Wanda Maximoff / Scarlet Witch and Paul Bettany as Vision in WandaVision, Anthony Mackie as Sam Wilson / Falcon and Sebastian Stan as Bucky Barnes / Winter Soldier in The Falcon and the Winter Soldier, Tom Hiddleston as the titular character in the first season of Loki, and Jeremy Renner as Clint Barton / Hawkeye in Hawkeye, where he is joined by Hailee Steinfeld as Kate Bishop / Hawkeye. Jeffrey Wright narrates What If...? as The Watcher, Oscar Isaac stars as Marc Spector / Moon Knight and Steven Grant / Mr. Knight in Moon Knight, Iman Vellani headlines Ms. Marvel as Kamala Khan / Ms. Marvel, and Tatiana Maslany portrays Jennifer Walters / She-Hulk in She-Hulk: Attorney at Law.

Returning actors for Phase Five include Samuel L. Jackson as Nick Fury and Ben Mendelsohn as Talos in Secret Invasion, Hiddleston in the second season of Loki, Dominique Thorne as Riri Williams / Ironheart in Ironheart, Alaqua Cox as Maya Lopez / Echo in Echo after appearing in Hawkeye, Kathryn Hahn as Agatha Harkness in Agatha: Coven of Chaos after appearing in WandaVision, and Charlie Cox reprising his role as Matt Murdock / Daredevil from Marvel Television's Netflix series and the films in Daredevil: Born Again after joining Maslany in She-Hulk: Attorney at Law. Additionally, the Wakanda series will star Danai Gurira returning as Okoye and Vision Quest will star Bettany, while Yahya Abdul-Mateen II will portray Simon Williams / Wonder Man in Wonder Man.

Phase Four

Phase Five

Future

See also 
 MCU film actors
 The Infinity Saga film actors
 Marvel Studios Special Presentations actors
 Marvel One-Shots actors
 MCU television actors (Marvel Television)

Notes

References

External links

Phase Four series 
 Full cast and crew for WandaVision at IMDb
 Full cast and crew for The Falcon and the Winter Soldier at IMDb
 Full cast and crew for Loki at IMDb
 Full cast and crew for What If...? at IMDb
 Full cast and crew for Hawkeye at IMDb
 Full cast and crew for Moon Knight at IMDb
 Full cast and crew for Ms. Marvel at IMDb
 Full cast and crew for She-Hulk: Attorney at Law at IMDb

Phase Five series 
 Full cast and crew for Secret Invasion at IMDb
 Full cast and crew for Ironheart at IMDb
 Full cast and crew for Echo at IMDb
 Full cast and crew for Agatha: Coven of Chaos at IMDb
 Full cast and crew for Daredevil: Born Again at IMDb

Lists of actors by American television series
Lists of actors by drama television series
Lists of actors by science fiction television series
Lists of actors by superhero television series

Television series actors, Marvel Studios